Alaric Hall (born 1979) is a British philologist who is an associate professor of English and director of the Institute for Medieval Studies at the University of Leeds. He has, since 2009, been the editor of the academic journal Leeds Studies in English and its successor Leeds Medieval Studies.

Biography

Hall received his B.A. in Anglo-Saxon, Norse and Celtic from the University of Cambridge, his M.Phil. in Medieval Studies from the University of Glasgow, and his Ph.D. in English from the University of Glasgow. His Ph.D. thesis was on elves in Anglo-Saxon England.

He has subsequently become an associate professor of English and director of the Institute for Medieval Studies at the University of Leeds. Hall researches and teaches the languages, cultures and history of Northwest Europe in the Middle Ages. He has written and edited several works on these subjects. Hall is also an authority on Icelandic language and literature.

His 2007 book Elves in Anglo-Saxon England received positive academic reviews. The medievalist and Tolkien scholar Tom Shippey described the work as an "exceptionally thorough study", while the Tolkien scholar Dimitra Fimi called it a "solidly scholarly work, with meticulous discussion of philological matters, and also an open-minded (although strictly evidence-based) attempt to look at the bigger picture."

Politics

Hall is an environmental campaigner, and since 2018 has regularly stood for election to Leeds City Council for the Green Party of England and Wales. For most of the 2010s he was a resident of the Leeds eco-building Greenhouse and was active in community organising in the local area of Beeston and Holbeck. His activities included campaigning in relation to the United Kingdom cladding crisis.

Within academia, Hall supports open-access publishing and has made his own research freely available online. Correspondingly, he edits Wikipedia, and incorporates editing into his teaching and research at the University of Leeds. He is a member of the University and College Union, campaigning during the 2013 and 2018–2020 UK higher education strikes.

Select bibliography

 Elves in Anglo-Saxon England: Matters of Belief, Health, Gender and Identity, 2007
 Interfaces Between Language and Culture in Medieval England, 2010
 Útrásarvíkingar: The Literature of the Icelandic Financial Crisis (2008–2014), 2020

References

Academics of the University of Leeds
Anglo-Saxon studies scholars
Alumni of the University of Cambridge
Alumni of the University of Glasgow
Living people
British literary historians
British non-fiction writers
British philologists
Celtic studies scholars
Germanic studies scholars
Old Norse studies scholars
Scandinavian studies scholars
1979 births
People educated at Aylesbury Grammar School